George Kenneth Butterfield Jr. (born April 27, 1947) is an American lawyer and politician who served as the U.S. representative for North Carolina's 1st congressional district from 2004 to 2022. A member of the Democratic Party, he was first elected in a special election after the resignation of Frank Ballance.

His district was in the state's northeastern corner, which included all or parts of 19 counties. A longtime advocate of civil rights, Butterfield was appointed an associate justice of the North Carolina Supreme Court by Governor Mike Easley in 2001, retaining the position until 2003. He was a member of the Congressional Black Caucus and served as its chair from 2015 to 2017.

In November 2021, Butterfield announced that he would not run for election in 2022.

On December 30, 2022, Butterfield resigned from his position to take up a lobbying position.

Early life and education
G. K. Butterfield was born and raised in the then segregated city of Wilson, North Carolina. Butterfield came from a prominent African-American family with a long history in North Carolina. Both of Butterfield's parents were mixed-race Americans. His maternal grandfather, Joe Davis, was a child of a former slave (Judah Davis) and a white man. His mother, Addie, taught elementary school for 48 years in some of North Carolina's poorest communities. She was keenly focused on ensuring that her students learned to read. Butterfield's father, G. K. Butterfield Sr., was an immigrant from Bermuda. As a graduate of Meharry Medical College, he practiced dentistry for 50 years in the poor, segregated community of East Wilson. In the late 1940s, he helped found the Wilson Branch of the NAACP in order to register black voters in the county. In 1953, he became the first African American elected to the city council in Wilson and the first black elected official in eastern North Carolina since Reconstruction.

Butterfield graduated from Charles H. Darden High School in Wilson. He went on to earn a Bachelor of Arts in political science and sociology from North Carolina Central University (NCCU), a historically black university. During his time at NCCU, Butterfield was active in voter registration activism, including coordinating voter registration drives in Durham and organizing a student march from the State Capitol in Raleigh to the Wilson County Courthouse to draw attention to the importance of voter registration. After completing his bachelor's degree, Butterfield attended the NCCU School of Law, receiving a Juris Doctor degree in 1974.

During his junior year at NCCU, Butterfield was drafted into the United States Army and stationed at Fort Bragg Army installation in Fayetteville. He served from 1968 to 1970 and was honorably discharged, and he returned to NCCU to complete his undergraduate degree.

In describing his racial identity as a black man, he has pointed to his African heritage, as a direct descendant of enslaved people. He grew up in racially segregated North Carolina, living in "East Wilson", where he attended black schools. He spent his childhood as a firsthand witness to the disenfranchisement of his black community originating as part of a targeted campaign to remove his father from the Board of Aldermen. He is the former chair of the Congressional Black Caucus.

Judicial career
After completing law school, Butterfield began a 14-year legal career as a civil rights attorney, practicing across eastern North Carolina. During this time, he developed his reputation, winning several voting-rights cases.

In 1988, Butterfield was elected Resident Superior Court judge in judicial district 7BC. Beginning on January 1, 1989, and for the next 12 years, he presided over civil and criminal court in 46 North Carolina counties. In February 2001, Governor Mike Easley appointed him to the North Carolina Supreme Court. In 2002, Butterfield lost his seat on the Supreme Court, but he returned to the Superior Court bench by special appointment of Governor Easley. He served in that position until his retirement in May 2004 to run for the U.S. House of Representatives.

Political career
Butterfield was first elected to the House of Representatives in a special election on July 20, 2004, to fill the seat of Frank Ballance, who had resigned after pleading guilty to conspiracy to commit mail fraud and money laundering. He assumed office on July 21, 2004.

U.S. House of Representatives

Elections

2004 Special 
Butterfield was elected to Congress in a special election on July 20, 2004, to fill the unexpired term of Representative Frank Ballance, who had resigned for health reasons. He defeated Republican nominee Greg Dority and Libertarian Party nominee Tom Eisenmenger. Butterfield was sworn into office on July 21, 2004.

On July 20, 2004, Butterfield won the Democratic primary, entitling him to run in the November general election. Running against Dority again, he won his first full term with 64% of the popular vote.

2006 

Butterfield was unopposed for reelection in 2006.

2008 

Butterfield defeated Dean Stephens with 70.28% of the vote.

2010 

Butterfield defeated Republican nominee Ashley Woolard with 59.31% of the vote.

2012 

Butterfield defeated Republican Pete DiLauro with 75.32% of the vote.

2014 

Butterfield defeated Republican Arthur Rich with 73.38% of the vote.

2016 

Butterfield defeated Republican H. Powell Dew Jr. with 68.62% of the vote.

2018 

Butterfield defeated Republican Roger W. Allison with 69.85% of the vote.

2020 

Butterfield defeated Republican Sandy Smith with 54.18% of the vote.

Committee assignments
Committee on Energy and Commerce
Subcommittee on Communications and Technology
Subcommittee on Energy
Subcommittee on Health
 Committee on House Administration
 Subcommittee on Elections

Caucus memberships
Congressional Black Caucus (first vice chair for the 113th United States Congress; chair for the 114th United States Congress) 
United States Congressional International Conservation Caucus
Congressional Motorcycle Safety Caucus
Congressional Out-of-Poverty Caucus

Butterfield served on the House Committee on Energy and Commerce, and formerly served on the House Armed Services Committee and the House Agriculture Committee. He was the Region VIII representative on the House Democratic Steering and Policy Committee.

Beginning in 2007, in the 110th Congress, Butterfield was chosen to serve as one of eight Chief Deputy Whips for the House Democratic Caucus. Chief Deputy Whips assist in the formulation of Democratic policy and ensure the passage of legislation by maintaining good communication with members. He was appointed to this position by Speaker Nancy Pelosi and Majority Whip Jim Clyburn.

Political positions
As a member of the House Committee on Energy and Commerce, Butterfield advocated for the American Clean Energy and Security Act. He supports "a market-based approach to capping carbon emissions" and wants to broaden the United States' sources of energy. On his website, Butterfield stresses the need to find more clean and domestic sources of energy.

A strong supporter of civil rights, Butterfield advocated renewal of the Voting Rights Act and "introduced a bill calling for the Capitol Visitor's Center to acknowledge the slave labor used to build the Capitol."

Originally endorsing John Edwards for the 2008 Democratic Party presidential nomination, Butterfield endorsed Barack Obama in January 2008.

In 2009, Butterfield introduced the Don't Let the Bed Bugs Bite Act "to assist states in carrying out inspections of lodging facilities, train inspection personnel, contract with a commercial exterminator; educate owners and staff at lodging facilities." He also passed H.R. 4252 "[t]o amend the Small Business Act to change the net worth amount under the small business program for socially and economically disadvantaged individuals from $750,000 to $978,722, and for other purposes."
 
Butterfield supported the Affordable Care Act, and worked with the Energy and Commerce Committee to help write the legislation. During the discussion of the bill in Congress, he complained about the lack of cooperation from Republicans.

Butterfield supports increasing taxes for higher-income families while decreasing taxes for middle- and low-income families. Although he is an advocate for using government stimulus in order to improve the economy, he wants to reduce government regulations on the private sector.

In 2008, Planned Parenthood gave Butterfield an 80% rating. In 2009, Butterfield supported the interests of NARAL Pro-Choice America 100% of the time. He identifies as pro-choice on abortion, and especially supports legalized abortion when the life of the woman is in danger or if the pregnancy is a result of rape or incest. He called the day that the Supreme Court overturned Roe v. Wade a "sad day".

Butterfield has repeatedly voted against defining marriage as being between one man and one woman, voting against the Marriage Protection Act of 2004 and constitutional marriage amendments in 2004 and 2006. He has voted to ban job discrimination based on sexual orientation, and in 2010 voted for the repeal of Don't Ask Don't Tell.

Butterfield voted in 2008 against the Troubled Asset Relief Program (TARP) $700 billion bailout of the financial industry and the $14 billion rescue package for the auto industry.

In 2011, he voted to extend expiring provisions of the PATRIOT Act and in favor of the National Defense Authorization Act (NDAA) for Fiscal Year 2012.

In 2012, Butterfield introduced legislation that would require more input from the public before tolls are introduced on roads. The legislation was in response to the "No toll on I-95" group, a Roanoke Rapids-based group that opposes instating a toll on I-95. Opponents of the toll argue that it leads to double taxation, and say it is the first time that "the federal government has put tolls on an existing interstate."

In April 2012, Butterfield accompanied Obama to the University of North Carolina at Chapel Hill to speak about extending the interest rates on federal loan programs for many undergraduate students. Butterfield expressed concern with the pending expiration, saying: "Allowing the current interest rates to expire would burden students with additional debt, prolong their ability to kick start their careers, and send the message that it is more important to cut taxes for the wealthy than educational expenses for our young people."

On July 23, 2014, Butterfield introduced House Joint Resolution 120, approving the location of a memorial to commemorate the more than 5,000 slaves and free black persons who fought for independence in the American Revolution.

Personal life

Butterfield is a lifelong member of Jackson Chapel First Missionary Baptist Church in Wilson, North Carolina, where he has served as Trustee and Chairman of the Finance Ministry. He also serves on the Board of Visitors for the North Carolina Central University School of Law and as a Trustee of Gallaudet University. He is a member of Groove Phi Groove Social Fellowship, Incorporated. In 2017, the City of Greenville named its new transit center, the G.K. Butterfield Transportation Center, in his honor.

See also
List of African-American United States representatives
North Carolina Democratic Party

References

External links

 

|-

|-

|-

|-

1947 births
20th-century African-American people
20th-century American judges
21st-century African-American politicians
21st-century American judges
21st-century American politicians
African-American judges
African-American members of the United States House of Representatives
African-American United States Army personnel
African-American people in North Carolina politics
American people of Bermudian descent
Baptists from North Carolina
Democratic Party members of the United States House of Representatives from North Carolina
Justices of the North Carolina Supreme Court
Living people
Members of Congress who became lobbyists
North Carolina Central University alumni
People from Wilson, North Carolina
United States Army soldiers